The Tale of the Body Thief is a horror novel by American writer  Anne Rice, the fourth  in her The Vampire Chronicles series, following The Queen of the Damned (1988).  Published in 1992, it continues the adventures of Lestat, specifically his efforts to regain his lost humanity during the late 20th century. Chapters from the book appeared in the October 1992 issue of Playboy.

Plot summary
At the beginning of the story, Lestat grows depressed and becomes remorseful because of his vampiric nature. Although he tries to limit his victims to murderers, serial killers and other criminals, he nonetheless caves into temptation once in a while and kills an "innocent", or someone who he feels does not necessarily deserve to die. Lestat also suffers from constant nightmares concerning his late "daughter", Claudia, for whose death he blames himself.

Since defeating Akasha, Lestat has become extremely lonely. Among his only remaining friends is David Talbot, the elderly mortal head of the Talamasca. Although Lestat has repeatedly offered to turn David, he has always refused to become a vampire and keep Lestat company through eternity. Lestat goes to the Gobi desert at dawn in a half-hearted suicide attempt. When he does not die, he goes to David's home in England to heal.

A mysterious figure, Raglan James, approaches Lestat with what seems to be a cure for his ennui and depression. James sends Lestat several messages hinting that he has the ability to switch bodies. Eventually, he proposes to Lestat that the two of them trade bodies for a day. Against the advice of David and other vampires, Lestat jumps at the opportunity. Unfortunately, James has no intention of ever switching back, and Lestat is forced to scheme to regain his body.

Lestat nearly dies after becoming human again—his new body is wracked by pneumonia, which he ignores during a tour of Washington D.C. in the middle of winter. He is saved by the care of a nun named Gretchen. He enjoys a short love affair with Gretchen before she returns to South America, where she works in a convent, and Lestat sets out in search of his body.

Lestat seeks help from other vampires but is completely ostracized. Marius is extremely angry at him for leaving such a powerful body to a thief. Likewise Louis turns Lestat away when he asks to turn his new body, arguing that Lestat ought to be happy to be human again and also calling him out for slandering him in previous writings. Lestat's only ally is David.

David reveals that James was a gifted psychic who once joined the Talamasca, but was kicked out of the order for constant theft. James is a kleptomaniac who has stolen or schemed for literally everything he owns, from his house to his body. However, he also has major psychic problems, and his life is a series of cycles—he gets rich by theft, then often ends up in prison. Dying of cancer several years before, James tricked an inmate of a mental institution into switching bodies with him, allowing him a type of immortality.

It is James's lack of imagination and petty thievery that allow Lestat and David to track him down. Despite his newfound wealth and powerful new body, James continues to steal jewelry from people. He also makes a conspicuous show of his wealth, boarding the Queen Elizabeth 2 and draining victims of their blood along the ship's path. The pattern allows his pursuers to easily find him aboard the ship. While Lestat manages to regain his body with David's help, he performs the switch during a sunrise and must immediately flee to a safe place during the day. When he awakes in the evening, he finds that both David and James have disappeared.

Lestat finds David in Florida and is surprised to find that his friend, despite his earlier protestations, now wants to become a vampire. However, while taking his blood, Lestat discovers a final trick—when forced out of Lestat's body, James took over David's body instead of returning to his own. Lestat angrily attacks James, crushing his skull. The blow proves fatal—the injury damages James's brain and prevents him from either leaving the dying body or attempting another switch.

David begins to enjoy life in the young body previously occupied by James. Lestat returns to New Orleans, reunites with Louis, and begins to renovate his old house in the French Quarter. However, Lestat regains his "evil" nature upon finally accepting his vampirism and decides to turn David against his wishes. David initially resists Lestat's aggressive advances, but eventually succumbs. Soon after David and Lestat admit their love for each other. David disappears again, prompting Lestat to fruitlessly search for him. Lestat returns to New Orleans and is surprised to find that David has already contacted Louis.

David explains to Lestat that, in secret, this is what he always truly wanted. He tells Lestat that he is no longer angry with him, although he does usurp Lestat's position of leadership, despite the latter's protests. Having gotten rid of his old age and mortality, David plans to visit Rio de Janeiro with Louis, and asks Lestat to join him. At the end, Lestat realizes that, despite all that happened, he is still alone, has failed to regain his "humanity", and has thrown away his only chance to make amends for his past misdeeds.

Motifs
In many ways, The Tale of the Body Thief lays the groundwork for the following Vampire Chronicles novel, Memnoch the Devil. David Talbot, in his occult fieldwork, has begun to understand the nature of the spirit world, and actually claims to have seen God and the Devil sitting and talking in a cafe.

In interviews after the book came out, Rice claimed that her own father's death helped to form the model for the relationship between Lestat and Talbot. Rice had loved her father very much (her mother died prematurely after succumbing to alcoholism), and when he was dying, she wished (as Lestat does with Talbot) that she could somehow make him young again so that she wouldn't lose him. This could make Tale of the Body Thief the second of two Vampire Chronicle novels inspired by Rice's personal tragedies, the first being Interview with the Vampire (which is denied by Rice).

Lestat's adjustment to his human body takes up a major portion of the book—after almost two centuries of being a vampire, he finds he has trouble with the basic human nuances of eating, defecating, and taking care of his body. One of the realizations made by Lestat is that he took his powers for granted for too long; only after his adventure is he able to fully appreciate his vampiric abilities.

Likewise, Lestat describes James as a devious and cunning opponent, a characterization he uses to justify how he was tricked. However, in reality, Raglan James is an extremely petty and predictable criminal who is constantly dropping clues as to his next move—at one point, Talbot refers to James as "a glorified purse snatcher".

The novel is also ironic in the cues that it leaves behind. For example, one of the "hints" that Raglan James leaves Lestat is a copy of H. P. Lovecraft's short story, "The Thing on the Doorstep". In the Lovecraft story, body-switching also takes place, and has an added twist when a third party gets involved without the narrator's knowledge. Lestat doesn't bother re-reading the short story; if he had, he might have anticipated Raglan James' final trick.

The darkest irony is Lestat's supposed concern for the elderly David Talbot. One of his nightmares concerns a flashback to when the young Talbot was a big-game hunter, and was nearly killed by a man-eating tiger. At the story's beginning, Lestat is constantly bothered by a foreboding that his friend is dying or in some mortal danger. He connects this feeling to William Blake's poem The Tyger, which is quoted piecemeal throughout the entire novel:

Tyger! Tyger! burning bright
In the forests of the night,
What immortal hand or eye
Could frame thy fearful symmetry?

At the end of the story, Lestat realizes with horror that he must have been the "tiger" of his visions.

Film adaptation
In 2007, The Tale of the Body Thief was rumored to be adapted into film as United Artists was interested in purchasing the film rights to the novel. Rice announced via her Facebook profile on February 7, 2012, that Brian Grazer and Ron Howard's film production company, Imagine Entertainment, had optioned the motion picture rights to the novel. Lee Patterson was to have written the screenplay. Transformer's Alex Kurtzman and Roberto Orci were also said to be on board as producers during the time of development.

"The plan is to treat the character (Lestat) as if audiences have not met him before," said Entertainment Weekly with word from Imagine.

On April 7, 2013, during a live-internet radio chat with her son Christopher and co-host Eric Shaw Quinn, Anne explained that a film adaptation is no longer in development and stated on her Facebook profile: "No Lestat movie in the works—after all these years, and the best efforts of all involved... We've encountered difficulties we cannot at this time overcome." Rice's son Christopher apparently drafted and adapted a screenplay from the novel that was met with praise from those involved; however, the project has been dismissed as the studio isn't "willing to move forward with it" due to differences that were beyond them.

As of August 2014, an entire reboot of The Vampire Chronicles was planned by producers Alex Kurtzman and Roberto Orci after the motion picture rights were optioned by Universal Pictures and Imagine Entertainment. Christopher Rice's screenplay for The Tale of the Body Thief was reportedly worked into the recent deal for a proposed film franchise and a reinterpretation of Interview with the Vampire was also hinted by Rice herself via Facebook. However, in November 2016 Universal did not renew the contract, and the film and television rights reverted to Rice, who began developing The Vampire Chronicles into a television series with Christopher.

References

The Vampire Chronicles novels
1992 American novels
1992 fantasy novels
1990s LGBT novels
Alfred A. Knopf books
American LGBT novels
Fiction about body swapping
Novels by Anne Rice
Vampire novels
LGBT speculative fiction novels
Books with cover art by Chip Kidd
American gothic novels
Male bisexuality in fiction
Novels with bisexual themes